The Complete BBC Peel Sessions is an album by The Delgados, released after the band broke up. It was released on their own Chemikal Underground record label in 2006 after they acquired the rights at the start of the year.

Session information 
 Alun Woodward - guitar, vocal
 Emma Pollock - guitar, vocal
 Stewart Henderson - bass guitar
 Paul Savage - drums

Reviews 

 Uncut 4/5
 Mojo 4/5
 NME 9/10
 Sunday Herald 4/5

Track listing
Disc 1
 "Lazarwalker"
 "Blackwell"
 "I've Only Just Started To Breathe"
 "Primary Alternative"
 "Under Canvas Under Wraps"
 "4th Channel"
 "Teen Elf"
 "Sucrose"
 "Everything Goes Around The Water"
 "Arcane Model"
 "Pull The Wires From The Wall"
 "Mauron Chanson"
 "Repeat Failure"
 "Don't Stop"
 "Blackpool"
 "Weaker Argument Defeats The Stronger"

Disc 2
 "No Danger"
 "Make Your Move"
 "Accused of Stealing"
 "Aye Today"
 "Mr. Blue Sky" (originally by Electric Light Orchestra)
 "California über alles" (originally by Dead Kennedys)
 "Matthew and Son" (originally by Cat Stevens)
 "Last Rose of Summer"
 "Parcel of Rogues"
 "I Fought the Angels"
 "Ballad of Accounting" (originally by Ewan MacColl)
 "Is This All That I Came For"
 "Everybody Come Down"

References

The Delgados albums
Peel Sessions recordings
2006 live albums
2006 compilation albums
Chemikal Underground compilation albums
Chemikal Underground live albums